Ram Sharan Mahat was the Finance Minister of Nepal under the government led by Sushil Koirala.

Political Career 
Mahat represented Nepali Congress in the parliament for four consecutive term and currently a parliamentarian from Nuwakot -2. 

He was a member of the 2nd Nepalese Constituent Assembly. He won the Nuwakot–2 seat in 2013 Nepalese Constituent Assembly election from the Nepali Congress.

Personal life 
Mahat was born to a middle-class family in Nuwakot, Nepal on 1 January 1951. He is the eldest of seven children of Khadga Bahadur Mahat and Tol Kumari Mahat.

He passed the School Leaving Certificate at the age of 13 in 1964.  Ram Sharan Mahat got his master's degree in Economics from Tribhuvan University in 1972. He was gold medalist in his college and university life. Following graduation from college at the age of 17, Mahat worked as a high school headmaster in Lamjung district of Nepal. He briefly worked as a lecturer in economics, at the Department of Tribhuvan University.
Despite being selected for scholarship, he was denied an opportunity to go abroad for advanced studies by the Panchayat government because of his political background. Instead, he was incarcerated for two years (1973–75) under Security Act without any charge sheet. After his release, he went to Gokhale Institute of Politics and Economics in Pune, India in 1976 for his Ph.D under a Government of India scholarship. He completed his degree in 1979.

Mahat was also a recipient of US Government's Hubert Humphrey Fellowship 1987/88 and was associated with the School of  International Studies of the American University, Washington DC, US. He was a recipient of the Francis Humbert Humphrey Award for leadership role in the public service by the USIA and the Institute of International Education, USA. He is an honorary fellow of the University of Connecticut/Bridgeport.

Mahat joined the UN service in 1980, and served at UNDP office in Kathmandu, New York and Pakistan. In his last assignment, he coordinated UNDP cross border humanitarian programme in Afghanistan (1989-1990). After the restoration of democratic politics in Nepal 1990, he left the UNDP job to join electoral politics in his country.

Political career

Dr. Ram Sharan Mahat, a senior leader of Nepali Congress, combines a rare background of an active politician and a technocrat. Born in a middle-class family in Nuwakot district of rural Nepal, he became politically active since early student days. He was imprisoned at the age of 14 while participating in a student demonstration. One of the leading student activists in his college and university days in Nepal, he was imprisoned several times by the autocratic monarchial regime in the sixties and seventies. After graduating in 1968 with a gold medal, he taught in a secondary school in a remote Lamjung district and became its headmaster at the age of 19. In 1971, he became the General Secretary of Nepal Students Union, the largest students association affiliated with Nepali Congress – outlawed by the autocratic regime from 1961 until 1990.

He campaigned actively for multiparty democracy in Nepal during the national referendum of 1980. He subsequently joined UNDP/Nepal as a programme officer and subsequently served as Area Officer in UNDP Headquarters Asia and Pacific Bureau in New York. 
After losing the parliamentary elections from constituent-1 of Nuwakot district in 1991, he was appointed the Economic Advisor to the Prime Minister of Nepal. He then served as the deputy chairman of the National Planning Commission of Nepal for three years (1991-1993).  He was elected Member of Parliament first time in 1993 from constituent-2 of Nuwakot district, which he has successfully retained to date. He won that seat for the fourth time in the November 2013 general election for the Constituent Assembly/Parliament.

A man of integrity and believer of probity and transparency in public life, he has voluntarily resigned as Finance Minister from cabinet twice. The first time in 1997 to facilitate judicial investigation, when the opposition raised question about his foreign exchange accounts in a NEW York Bank. He was acquitted of the charge and subsequently reinstated to his position. The second time he resigned in 2002 protesting the Prime Minister's unexpected announcement to dissolve the parliament.

Following the royal takeover of political power in 2002, he actively participated in Nepal's 'anti-regression movement', which culminated in the mass uprising of April 2006 leading eventually to the abolition of monarchy. He was the Finance Minister of the first national unity government formed afterwards, which eventually included the ex Maoist rebels also.

In Nepal's turbulent political transition following the decade-long Maoist insurgency in Nepal, Mahat also served as member of the Special Committee for the Integration and Rehabilitation of Maoist Army Combatants, which saw the successful resolution in 2013 on the future of some 17,000 former combatants.

He has also served in the board of trustees of the Asian Institute of Technology, Bangkok (1993/4).

Publications 
Mahat has several publications to his credit, including the widely acclaimed book In Defence of Democracy: Dynamics and Fault lines of Nepal's Political Economy (2005).

References

Nepali Congress politicians from Bagmati Province
Living people
1951 births
Government ministers of Nepal
Finance ministers of Nepal
People from Nuwakot District
Nepal MPs 1994–1999
Nepal MPs 1999–2002
Members of the 1st Nepalese Constituent Assembly
Members of the 2nd Nepalese Constituent Assembly